Josephine Blanche d'Alpuget (born 3 January 1944) is an Australian writer and the second wife of Bob Hawke, the longest-serving Labor Prime Minister of Australia.

Background and early career
D'Alpuget is the only child of Josephine Curgenven and Louis Albert Poincaré d'Alpuget (1915–2006), journalist, author, blue water yachtsman and champion boxer.  Her great-aunt, Blanche d'Alpuget, after whom she was named, was a pioneer woman journalist in Sydney and a patron of artists.  Her father was a sports and feature writer and also news editor of a Sydney newspaper, The Sun.

D'Alpuget attended SCEGGS Darlinghurst and briefly the University of Sydney. She worked at The Sun's rival newspaper, The Daily Mirror, then moved to Indonesia at the age of 22 with her first husband, Tony Pratt, whom she had married in 1965. She and Pratt have a son, Louis, an artist and sculptor and a co-founder of Mungo, a Sydney artists' colony.  While in Indonesia, d'Alpuget worked in the Australian Embassy's news and information bureau; later she was a volunteer worker in the National Museum of Indonesia, leading a team that recatalogued the oriental ceramic collection of Chinese export ware. She was the world's youngest member of the famous English-founded Oriental Ceramic Society.  After spending four years in Indonesia, d'Alpuget lived for a year in Malaysia.  She travelled widely, and to remote areas, in both countries.

Writing career
In 1973 d'Alpuget returned to Australia and became active in the women's movement. She began writing in 1974, inspired by her experiences in South East Asia and has won a number of literary awards for both fiction and non-fiction including, in 1987, the inaugural Australasian Prize for Commonwealth Literature. d'Alpuget first met Bob Hawke in Jakarta, in 1970.  They met again in 1976 when she interviewed him for a biography she was writing on Sir Richard Kirby. This meeting led to a long and sporadic love affair which eventually culminated in their marriage in 1995. D'Alpuget and Pratt had divorced in 1986. Between 1979 and 1982 d'Alpuget researched and wrote a biography of Hawke.

In 1995 she joined the board of Robert J. Hawke & Associates, a business consultancy primarily focussed on China. For fifteen years d'Alpuget abandoned her career as a writer and travelled the world with her new husband, visiting not only capital cities but remote areas of China, Inner Mongolia, Moldova, Easter Island, Palau, Kazakhstan, the North West Frontier of Pakistan and the Antarctic peninsula. She returned to writing in 2008.

In 2013 d'Alpuget released The Young Lion, the first novel of a quintet. Set in the 12th century, the novel is about the birth of the House of Plantagenet and focuses on Henry II and his union with Eleanor of Aquitaine, who was Queen of France and subsequently became Queen of England. The Young Lion received favourable reviews. Geraldine Doogue said "this is exuberant story-telling history, full of sex, passion and politics." while Stephanie Dowrick notes that "few writers are both earthy and erudite, Blanche d'Alpuget is. Her narrative is so fresh and energetic you will swear she's bringing us a first-hand account." The magazine Books + Publishing made similar comments stating that "Blanche d'Alpuget's first historical fiction novel comes as a breath of fresh air as she introduces readers to Henry II and the beginning of the House of Plantagenet. D'Alpuget offers readers a well-researched history of her subject, which of course incorporates the required affairs, plots and intrigues that we have come to expect from any historical novel about royalty and life at court." The second in the quintet, The Lion Rampant, was published in 2014 to critical acclaim. Thomas Keneally said, "this is fresh and invigorating and absolutely gripping. The revision she provides of the motives and character of Thomas Becket will rivet readers as they have not been riveted since Hilary Mantel's Thomas Cromwell." She completed the third novel in the quintet, The Lions' Torment, in 2015 but held it back from the market until the fourth, The Lioness Wakes, was finished in early 2017. The fifth book in the quintet, The Cubs Roar, was published in 2020. Meanwhile, she is researching the Second Crusade.

Published works
Her works include:

 
 
 
 
 
 Lust (an essay, 1992)

Reviews and further works
Her essays, Lust, which dealt with paedophilia, and On Longing, caused controversy.

Turtle Beach was made into a feature film in 1989 featuring Greta Scacchi and Jack Thompson.

All d'Alpuget's novels have been translated into other languages.

Asher Keddie played her in the 2010 multi-award-winning telemovie, Hawke.

Achievements and awards
Included in awards are:
 1980 – Sydney PEN Golden Jubilee award for Fiction
 1981 – NSW Premier's Award for Non-Fiction
 1982 and 1983 – Braille Book of the Year Award
 1982 – The Age Novel of the Year Award for Turtle Beach
 1982 – South Australian Government's Award for Fiction
 1987 – Inaugural Commonwealth Award for Literature – Australasian Division

References

External links
 Blanche d'Alpuget

1944 births
Living people
20th-century Australian novelists
21st-century Australian novelists
20th-century Australian women writers
21st-century Australian women writers
Australian biographers
Australian people of French descent
Australian women novelists
Bob Hawke
Writers from Sydney
Women biographers
20th-century biographers
21st-century biographers
People educated at Sydney Church of England Girls Grammar School